Jovan Erdeljanović (11 November 1874 – 12 February 1944) was a Serbian and Yugoslav ethnologist.

Biography
Jovan Erdeljanović was born in Pančevo, Austria-Hungary. He studied at the universities of Vienna, Berlin, Leipzig and Prague. In 1905 he obtained his doctorate as Doctor of Philosophy at Charles University in Prague. In 1906, Erdeljanović began working at the University of Belgrade, elected Professor at Department of Ethnology of the philosophical Faculty since 1922. He remained at the University until 1941 and was member of Serbian Academy of Sciences.

The first recognized work of anthropological interest in ethnicity was done by Erdeljanović, named as one of the founding fathers of Serbian ethnology. His works are influenced by ideas of evolutionism and Yugoslavism and he represented the theory that Yugoslavs are people of one blood and one origin.

Selected works
Etnološka građa i rasprave, Srpska kraljevska akademija, Belgrade 1911.
 Tragovi najstarijeg slovenskog sloja u Banatu, Niederlův sbornik, Prague 1925.
 
 O poreklu Bunjevaca, Srpska kraljevska akademija, Belgrade 1930.
Forschungen über Alter, Organisation und Überlieferungen serbischer Stämme in Montenegro, Herzegovina und in den Nachbargebieten Jugoslawiens, Brill, Leiden 1936.
 Koju ćemo kulturu: samo srpsku ili jugoslovensku?, Zora, Belgrade 1938.

See also
 Sima Trojanović
 Tihomir Đorđević
 Ljubomir Davidović

References

1874 births
1944 deaths
Writers from Pančevo
Yugoslav zoologists
Academic staff of the University of Belgrade
Academic staff of Belgrade Higher School
Charles University alumni
Academic staff of Charles University
Members of the Serbian Academy of Sciences and Arts
20th-century Serbian people
Ethnologists
Serbian studies